Solórzano or Solorzano is a Spanish surname that may refer to:

Alonso de Castillo Solórzano (1584–1647), Spanish novelist and playwright
Amalia Solórzano (1911–2008), the First Lady of Mexico from 1934 to 1940
Ana Beatriz Martínez Solórzano (born 1946), Mexican actress, singer producer and former model
Bianca Solorzano (born 1974), correspondent for CBS News in New York
Carlos José Solórzano (1860–1936), the President of Nicaragua between 1925 and 1926
Carlos Solórzano (1919–2011), Guatemalan born Mexican playwright
Cuauhtemoc Cardenas Solorzano (born 1934), prominent Mexican politician
David Solórzano (born 1980), Nicaraguan footballer
Delsa Solórzano (born 1971), Venezuelan politician
Elmar Díaz Solórzano (born 1969), Mexican politician affiliated to the Institutional Revolutionary Party
Erasmo Solórzano (born 1985), Mexican soccer player
Fernando Guzmán Solórzano (1812–1891), the President of Nicaragua from 1867 to 1871
Fidel Solórzano (born 1962), retired male athlete from Ecuador who competed in long jump and decathlon
Javier Solórzano, journalist in México
Jean Carlos Solórzano (born 1988), Costa Rican footballer forward
José de Grimaldo y Gutiérrez de Solorzano (1660–1733), Spanish statesmen
Leopoldo José Brenes Solórzano (born 1949), Nicaraguan cardinal of the Roman Catholic Church
Lissette Solorzano, professional photographer born in Santiago de Cuba in 1969
Nelson Solórzano (born 1959), Venezuelan former basketball player who competed in the 1992 Summer Olympics

See also
Solórzano, municipality in Cantabria, Spain
Emilia Solórzano Alfaro (1835–1882), the First Lady of Costa Rica during the periods of 1870–1876 and 1877–1882
Camila Solórzano Ayusa (born 1989), Argentine beauty pageant titleholder who was crowned Miss Argentina 2012
Juan de Solórzano Pereira (1575–1655), Spanish jurist, oidor of Lima, early writer on the native law of South America
Solano (disambiguation)
Sorzano
Lozano (disambiguation)